Arjun Janya (born Lokesh Kumar) is an Indian film score soundtrack composer and singer. Arjun made his film debut in the 2006 Kannada film Autograph Please. Since then he has composed and scored music for successful films such as Birugaali (2009), Sanchari (2010),  Kempegowda (2011), Varadanayaka (2012), Victory (2013), Vajrakaya (2015), Mukunda Murari (2016).
His 100th film as music director is  99  (2019 film).

Arjun Janya won the Karnataka State Film Award for Best Music Director for the film Alemaari (2012), the SIIMA Award for Best Music Director for the film Romeo (2012) and the Filmfare Best Music Director award for the film Bhajarangi (2013).

Career
Arjun started his career by assisting composers such as V. Manohar and K. Kalyan. He worked as a keyboard player for around 30 films.

His first release as a music director was Autograph Please (2006) starring Sanjjanaa and Dilip Raj. Since then, he composed for various films but with little success until he scored the music for the film Birugaali in 2009. All the songs of this film were noticed and appreciated. Following this, he tasted success by scoring for the film Sanchari in 2010.

Arjun's biggest breakthrough came with the Sudeep vehicle Kempe Gowda in 2011, a remake of the Tamil blockbuster Singam. During this time, he changed his name from Arjun to Arjun Janya upon his astrologer's suggestion and Sudeep's recommendation. Some articles report that a meeting between Arjun and Oscar-winning composer A. R. Rahman changed his fortunes in the music industry. The song "Khaali Quarter" composed for the 2013 film Victory became popular and was on top of the charts for many weeks. He scored for his 50th film composition for Vajrakaya which released in April 2015 which received rave reviews.

Arjun is currently judging the Kannada version of the reality singing show, Sa Re Ga Ma Pa  in Zee Kannada channel along with singer Vijay Prakash and music composer Hamsalekha.

Discography

As a composer

As a singer

Cameo appearance
Bhajarangi (2013)

Television
Weekend with ramesh season 3

References

External links

Notes
 Arjun Janya hits 25
 Tunes 'Gods Gift' – Arjun Janya

Living people
Kannada film score composers
Filmfare Awards South winners
Kannada playback singers
Indian male playback singers
1980 births
Indian male film score composers